The middle latitudes (also called the mid-latitudes, sometimes midlatitudes, or moderate latitudes) are a spatial region on Earth located between the Tropic of Cancer (latitudes 23°26'22") to the Arctic Circle (66°33'39"), and Tropic of Capricorn (-23°26'22") to the Antarctic Circle (-66°33'39"). They include Earth's subtropical and temperate zones, which lie between the two tropics and the polar circles. Weather fronts and extratropical cyclones are usually found in this area, as well as occasional tropical cyclones or subtropical cyclones, which have traveled from their areas of formation closer to the Equator.

The prevailing winds in the middle latitudes are often very strong. These parts of the world also see a wide variety of fast-changing weather as cold air masses from the poles and warm air masses from the tropics constantly push up and down over them against each other, sometimes alternating within hours of each other, especially in the roaring forties (latitudes between 40° and 50° in both hemispheres), even though the winds on the northern hemisphere aren't as strong as in the southern hemisphere, due to the large landmasses of North America, Europe and Asia.

There are five types of mid-latitude climates: mediterranean, humid subtropical, marine west coast, humid continental and subarctic.

See also
 Temperate climate
 Geographical zone
 Polar circle
 Subarctic climate
 Subtropics
 Tropics

References

Circles of latitude